A heat current is a kinetic exchange rate between molecules, relative to the material in which the kinesis occurs.

For conduction, heat current is defined by Fourier's law as
 
where
 is the amount of heat transferred per unit time [W] and

 is an oriented surface area element [m2]
The above differential equation, when integrated for a homogeneous material of 1-D geometry between two endpoints at constant temperature, gives the heat flow rate as:
 
where
 A is the cross-sectional surface area,
  is the temperature difference between the ends,
  is the distance between the ends.  

For thermal radiation, heat current is defined as

Heat current can also be thought of as the total phonon distribution multiplied by the energy of one phonon, times the group velocity of the phonons. The phonon distribution of a particular phonon mode is given by the Bose-Einstein factor, which is dependent on temperature and phonon energy.

See also
 Thermal conduction
 Thermal conductivity

Heat transfer